Feren or Færen is a lake in the municipality of Meråker in Trøndelag county, Norway. A small part in the northwestern corner of the lake extends into the municipalities of Stjørdal, Levanger, and Verdal at the outlet into the river Forra.

See also
List of lakes in Norway

References

Lakes of Trøndelag
Meråker
Stjørdal
Levanger
Verdal